Tymazoline (trade name Thymazen in Poland) is a nasal decongestant that can be used to treat rhinitis. It acts as an antihistaminic and sympathomimetic, reducing swelling, inflammation and mucosal secretions.

References

Imidazolines
Phenol ethers